Longueuil–Saint-Hubert station is a commuter rail station operated by Exo in the Saint-Hubert borough of Longueuil, Quebec, Canada.

It is served by the Mont-Saint-Hilaire line.

History
The current, permanent station and facilities opened on August 26, 2013, replacing a temporary train station named Saint-Hubert that had been set up several hundred meters to the east since December 2003. The new installations include longer, permanent platforms that allow access to all cars of the train, new shelters and a tunnel allowing access to both platforms.

The new station is equipped with a work of public art, a sculpture by Marie-France Brière titled Zigzag. It stands opposite the station building.

Connecting bus routes

Réseau de transport de Longueuil

References

External links
 Longueuil–Saint-Hubert Commuter Train Station Information (RTM)
 Longueuil–Saint-Hubert Commuter Train Station Schedule (RTM)

Exo commuter rail stations
Transport in Longueuil
Buildings and structures in Longueuil
Railway stations in Montérégie
Railway stations in Canada opened in 2003